Fran Frey (December 23, 1903 in Indiana - December 1, 1962 in California) was a singer and saxophonist best known for his work for George Olsen and His Music in the 1920s and early 1930s. Among his better known songs are "The Varsity Drag" of 1927; "Big City Blues" of 1929, and "A Garden in the Rain", also of 1929. Frey sang on 77 songs with the George Olsen band on recordings and on the radio. "Who?" sold more than a million copies.

Frey was heard on the Oldsmobile Program on CBS radio in 1933.

Although he played for several other bands after Olsen's, including Victor Young's, he never achieved the level of fame he had in earlier years.

Frey died of a heart attack in his home on December 2, 1962 at the age of 58. At the time of his death, he was writing music for the Ice Capades and for Columbia Pictures.

References

External links
AllMusic entry
 Fran Frey recordings at the Discography of American Historical Recordings.

1903 births
1962 deaths
American male saxophonists
20th-century American singers
20th-century American saxophonists
20th-century American male singers